Jorge Filipe Oliveira Fernandes (born 2 April 1997) is a Portuguese professional footballer who plays for Vitória S.C. as a central defender.

Club career

Porto
Born in Braga, Minho Province, Fernandes joined FC Porto's youth academy at the age of 10. On 15 August 2015, still a junior, he made his senior debut with their reserves by coming on as a 59th-minute substitute in a 2–1 away win against C.D. Santa Clara in the Segunda Liga. He scored his first goal in the competition on 16 September 2017, helping the hosts defeat C.D. Nacional 2–1.

On 31 January 2018, Fernandes was loaned to Primeira Liga club C.D. Tondela. His maiden appearance in the Portuguese top division took place nine days later when he replaced Pedro Nuno shortly after Ícaro was sent off in the away fixture against F.C. Paços de Ferreira, helping his team secure a 2–0 victory. The move was extended for the 2018–19 season.

Vitória Guimarães
After a season on loan at Kasımpaşa S.K. in the Turkish Süper Lig, Fernandes rescinded his Porto contract and signed a five-year deal at Vitória de Guimarães, who purchased 60% of his economic rights on 1 August 2020. He scored his first top-flight goal on the following 19 May, in a 3–1 home loss to S.L. Benfica.

International career
Fernandes earned 32 caps for Portugal across all youth levels. He scored his one goal on 5 June 2015 for the under-18 team in a 3–1 win over China in Mafra, to win the Torneio de Lisboa.

Fernandes was part of the under-20 side that reached the quarter-finals of the 2017 FIFA World Cup in South Korea. In 2018, he took part with the under-21 team in qualification for the following year's UEFA European Championship.

References

External links

Portuguese League profile 

1997 births
Living people
Sportspeople from Braga
Portuguese footballers
Association football defenders
Primeira Liga players
Liga Portugal 2 players
Padroense F.C. players
FC Porto B players
C.D. Tondela players
Vitória S.C. players
Süper Lig players
Kasımpaşa S.K. footballers
Portugal youth international footballers
Portugal under-21 international footballers
Portuguese expatriate footballers
Expatriate footballers in Turkey
Portuguese expatriate sportspeople in Turkey